The office of the president of Russia is the highest authority in the Russian Federation. The office is the federation's head of state and has formal presidency over the State Council as well as being the commander in chief of the Russian Armed Forces. The office  was to be introduced in 1918 after the February Revolution with the current office emerging after a referendum of 1991. During the Soviet period of history, Russia was de jure headed by collective bodies such as the All-Russian Central Executive Committee and the Presidium of the Supreme Soviet, since the Soviet theory of government denied the very necessity of the presidential office. The office of the President of the Soviet Union was introduced in 1990 during Mikhail Gorbachev's unsuccessful reforms of the Soviet Union's one-party communist state. Gorbachev became first and last president of the Union. His tenure was marked by the legal and political confrontation with Russia and other republics of the USSR which eventually led to their full independence in late 1991.

Presidents

Acting presidents

Timeline

Subsequent public service
Two presidents held other high offices after leaving the presidency.

See also 
 President of Russia
 List of leaders of Russia
 List of Russian monarchs (before 1917)
 List of heads of state of Russia (from 1917)
 Politics of Russia
 Government of Russia

Notes

References

External links
 Central Bank of Russia
 Energy Statistics for Russia – From the Energy Information Administration
 Federative Council—Official site of the parliamentary upper house

List
Russian
Presidents
Presidents

it:Presidenti della Federazione Russa
la:Index praesidum Russiae